Mount Chaval is a craggy  mountain summit  located in Skagit County of Washington state. Situated within the Glacier Peak Wilderness, Mount Chaval is positioned west of the crest of the North Cascades Range, approximately 15 miles northeast of the town of Darrington. It has two subsidiary peaks, East Peak and Middle Peak, each 7040 ft. Its nearest higher neighbor is Snowking Mountain,  to the northeast. Precipitation runoff from Mount Chaval drains into tributaries of the Skagit River.

Climate
Mount Chaval is located in the marine west coast climate zone of western North America. Most weather fronts originate in the Pacific Ocean, and travel northeast toward the Cascade Mountains. As fronts approach the North Cascades, they are forced upward by the peaks of the Cascade Range (Orographic lift), causing them to drop their moisture in the form of rain or snowfall onto the Cascades. As a result, the west side of the North Cascades experiences high precipitation, especially during the winter months in the form of snowfall. During winter months, weather is usually cloudy, but, due to high pressure systems over the Pacific Ocean that intensify during summer months, there is often little or no cloud cover during the summer. Because of maritime influence, snow tends to be wet and heavy, resulting in high avalanche danger.

Geology
The North Cascades features some of the most rugged topography in the Cascade Range with craggy peaks and ridges, deep glacial valleys, and granite spires. Geological events occurring many years ago created the diverse topography and drastic elevation changes over the Cascade Range leading to the various climate differences.

The history of the formation of the Cascade Mountains dates back millions of years ago to the late Eocene Epoch. With the North American Plate overriding the Pacific Plate, episodes of volcanic igneous activity persisted.  In addition, small fragments of the oceanic and continental lithosphere called terranes created the North Cascades about 50 million years ago. The rock of Mount Chaval is Chaval pluton, a pyroxene-bearing diorite and tonalite.

During the Pleistocene period dating back over two million years ago, glaciation advancing and retreating repeatedly scoured the landscape leaving deposits of rock debris. The “U”-shaped cross section of the river valleys are a result of recent glaciation. Uplift and faulting in combination with glaciation have been the dominant processes which have created the tall peaks and deep valleys of the North Cascades area.

Gallery

See also

 Geography of Washington (state)
 Geology of the Pacific Northwest

References

External links
 Chaval definition at Wiktionary
 Weather forecast: Mount Chaval
Glacier Peak Wilderness (Mt. Baker-Snoqualmie National Forest) U.S. Forest Service
 Mount Chaval aerial photo: PBase

North Cascades
Mountains of Washington (state)
Mountains of Skagit County, Washington
Cascade Range
North American 2000 m summits